János Nagy (born 27 January 1975) is a Hungarian boxer. He competed in the men's featherweight event at the 1996 Summer Olympics.

References

External links
 

1975 births
Living people
Hungarian male boxers
Olympic boxers of Hungary
Boxers at the 1996 Summer Olympics
Sportspeople from Győr
Featherweight boxers